The 1988 Philippine Basketball Association (PBA) rookie draft was an event at which teams drafted players from the amateur ranks. The draft was held on February 29, 1988.

Round 1

Round 2

Undrafted players
Leoncio Tan, Jr
Joseph Uichico

Direct-hire rookies
The PBA's newest ballclub Purefoods Hotdogs signed Glenn Capacio from FEU, Jerry Codiñera from UE, Jojo Lastimosa from San Jose-Recoletos and Alvin Patrimonio from Mapua as direct rookie free agents.

References

Philippine Basketball Association draft
draft
PBA draft
PBA draft